Inter Glass ASC is an Azerbaijani glass manufacturing company created in December 2008. According to the company, it is one of the biggest glass producers in the Caucasus region.

Company overview

Products and services
The company makes over 70 different kinds of glass bottles.

Location
The company is located at 25, Salyan Highway, Baku, Azerbaijan.

Financial
The company's production is estimated at around 85 million units per year. In 2008, the International Bank of Azerbaijan funded construction of an Inter Glass factory in the amount of $5 million Euro.

People and history

People
The Director of the company is Fariz Muradov.

As of April 2012, the CEO of the company was Alis Muradov.

History
 The company owns a subsidiary called Inter Glass Georgia. Sixty percent of Inter Glass Georgia is owned by Inter Glas, with the other 40 percent owned by a Georgian gas company.
 Inter Glass Georgia in 2012 began construction of a new plant in Khashuri, Georgia worth over US$18 million.
 Inter Glas started another business called Brickwork House Construction Ltd. in 2009. It invested $52 million AZN into a new glass production plant.
 Inter Glass also has a plant in Tokmok in the Chüy region of Kyrgyzstan that was opened in 2012.

References

Companies based in Baku
Manufacturing companies established in 2008
Glassmaking companies of Azerbaijan
Azerbaijani brands